Gennaro Manna (12 December 1715 - 28 December 1779) was an Italian composer based in Naples. He was a member of the Neapolitan School. His compositional output includes 13 operas and more than 150 sacred works, including several oratorios.

Life 
He made his operatic debut at the Teatro Argentina in Rome with Tito Manlio on January 21, 1742. Thanks to its success, he received a new commission from the Teatro San Giovanni Grisostomo in Venice for the carnival of the following year, where he gave Siroe re di Persia.

After his return to Naples, he composed Festa teatrale per la nascita dell'Infante with Nicola Bonifacio Logroscino, which was never staged. Between 1760 and 1761 he performed his last theatrical works, the serenata Enea in Cuma and the opera seria Temistocle. In January 1761 he succeeded his uncle Feo as director of the chapel of the Santissima Annunziata Maggiore, and on May 9 of the same year he received the same position for the Naples Cathedral. He remained active as a composer of sacred music until his death.

Within his family his brother  and his cousin  also gained fame as musicians.

Style
Unlike his contemporaries Niccolò Jommelli, Gaetano Latilla and Girolamo Abos, he left the field of opera buffa to deal only with that of the opera seria, in which he was much appreciated by the composers of his time. In his compositional style there are elements of both the galant style and pre-classicism.

Works

Theatrical works 
 Tito Manlio (opera seria, libretto by Gaetano Roccaforte, 1742, Rome)
 Siroe re di Persia (opera seria, libretto by Pietro Metastasio, 1743, Venice)
 Festa teatrale per la nascita dell'Infante (serenata, in collaboration with Nicola Bonifacio Logroscino, 1743, Naples, never staged)
 Artaserse (opera seria, revision of the opera of the same name by Leonardo Vinci, libretto by Pietro Metastasio, 1743, Naples)
 Achille in Sciro (opera seria, libretto by Pietro Metastasio, 1745)
 L'Impero dell'universo con Give (componimento drammatico, libretto by Ranieri de' Calzabigi, 1745, Naples)
 Lucio Vero ossia Il Vologeso (opera seria, libretto by Apostolo Zeno, 1745, Teatro San Carlo di Napoli, with Gaetano Majorano ed Annibale Pio Fabri)
 Arsace (opera seria, 1746, Naples)
 La clemenza di Tito (opera seria, 1747, Messina)
 Adriano placata (opera seria, 1748, Ferrara)
 Lucio Papirio dittatore (opera pastorale, libretto by Apostolo Zeno, 1748, Roma)
 Il Lucio Papirio (opera seria, 1749, Palermo)
 Eumene (opera seria, libretto by Apostolo Zeno, 1750, Turin)
 Didone abbandonata (opera seria, libretto by Pietro Metastasio, 1751, Venice)
 Demofoonte (opera seria, libretto by Pietro Metastasio, 1754, Teatro Regio di Torino directed by Giovanni Battista Somis)
 Enea in Cuma (serenata, 1760, Naples)
 Il Sacrificio di Melchisedec (componimento drammatico, libretto by M. Tarzia, 1776, Naples)

Sacred music

Oratorios 
 Gios re di Giuda (1747, Naples)
 Sepultra Sarae sive Pietas in mortuos (1748)
 Davide (Palermo, 1751)
 Rubri maris trajectus (Monte Reale, 1761)
 Debora (1769)
 Esther (1770)
 Il Seraficio Alverna (Naples)
 Israelis liberato sive Esther (Monte Reale)

Other sacred music 
 12 masses
 7 Gloria
 Domine ad adiuvantum for 5 voices
 2 Credo
 2 Magnificat
 3 Te Deum
 14 Lamentations
 Christus
 2 Lezioni per la notte del Santissimo Natale
 3 Jube Domine benedicere for solo voice
 3 Benedictus Dominus
 Confitebor for solo voice
 12 Dixit
 2 Laudate pueri for solo voice
 Gloria patri for solo voice
 2 Veni sponsa
 Lauda Sion for 5 voices
 Pange lingua
 4 Inni
 Tantum ergo for solo voice
 Cori di anime penanti for 5 voices
 35 motets with choir
 14 motets and arias for solo voice
 Passion according to John
 Other minor works

References

1715 births
1779 deaths
Italian male classical composers
Italian opera composers
Male opera composers
18th-century Italian composers
18th-century Italian male musicians